Bowman River, a perennial river of the Gloucester River catchment, is located in the Upper Hunter district of New South Wales, Australia.

Course and features
Bowman River rises on the eastern slopes of the Great Dividing Range, near Upper Bowman, and flows generally south southeast and east before reaching its confluence with the Gloucester River, near Tugrabakh. The river descends  over its  course.

See also 

 Rivers of New South Wales
 List of rivers of New South Wales (A–K)
 List of rivers of Australia

References

External links
 

Rivers of New South Wales
Mid North Coast
Rivers of the Hunter Region
Mid-Coast Council